Hassan Nazer is a British-Iranian film director, film editor, producer and a judge in international film festivals. He was the head of jury team in SAARC Film Festival 2019 which was held in Sri Lanka.

Career 
Now in his early forties, Hassan’s successful Aberdeen-based restaurant business Cafe Harmony has allowed him to self-finance three feature films in the decade before Winners. Until now, he has never been supported practically or financially by the Scottish or wider UK film industry, preferring to shape his own destiny working at extreme low-budgets, learning his craft and making a name for himself in Iran, India and Afghanistan.  Nazer studied at art university in Tehran. After moving to UK, he attended the University of Aberdeen where he studied Cinema.
His third film, Utopia was selected as the Afghan entry for the Best Foreign Language Film at the 88th Academy Awards and at Golden Globes. The film has won more than 18 awards in nationally and internationally film festivals.</ref>https://www.screen.scot/news/2022/08/winners-to-premiere-at-edinburgh-international-film-festival-2022</ref>

Selected filmography

As director 
 The Check Post 
 Winners
 Ma hameh gonahkarim
 Utopia
 Here... Iran
 Black Day

As producer 
 American Soldier 
Ma hameh gonahkarim 
Whistle My Lad 
 Black Day

As editor 
 Ma hameh gonahkarim 
 Black Day

References

https://deadline.com/2022/08/winners-review-edinburgh-international-film-festival-hassan-nazer-1235093153/

https://www.tehrantimes.com/news/476084/Winners-wins-audience-award-at-Edinburgh-Intl-Film-Festival

 https://www.screendaily.com/reviews/winners-edinburgh-review/5173444.article

https://www.screendaily.com/features/17-films-to-watch-from-the-summer-festivals/5173904.article?amp;amp;amp;amp

External links

Living people
Iranian film directors
Iranian film producers
Iranian film editors
Year of birth missing (living people)